Creedia partimsquamigera, the half-scaled sand-diver, is a species of sandburrowers found around Sydney, Australia.

References

Creediidae
Fish of Australia
Taxa named by Joseph S. Nelson
Fish described in 1983